Bitemporal hemianopsia, is the medical description of a type of partial blindness where vision is missing in the outer half of both the right and left visual field. It is usually associated with lesions of the optic chiasm, the area where the optic nerves from the right and left eyes cross near the pituitary gland.

Causes
In bitemporal hemianopsia, vision is missing in the outer (temporal or lateral) half of both the right and left visual fields. Information from the temporal visual field falls on the nasal (medial) retina. The nasal retina is responsible for carrying the information along the optic nerve, and crosses to the other side at the optic chiasm. When there is compression at optic chiasm, the visual impulse from both nasal retina are affected, leading to inability to view the temporal, or peripheral, vision. This phenomenon is known as bitemporal hemianopsia. Knowing the neurocircuitry of visual signal flow through the optic tract is very important in understanding bitemporal hemianopsia.

Bitemporal hemianopsia most commonly occurs as a result of tumors located at the mid-optic chiasm. Since the adjacent structure is the pituitary gland, some common tumors causing compression are pituitary adenomas and craniopharyngiomas. Also, another relatively common neoplastic cause is meningiomas. A cause of vascular origin is an aneurysm of the anterior communicating artery which arise superior to the chiasm, enlarge, and compress it from above.

Etymology
The absence of vision in half of a visual field is described as hemianopsia.

The visual field of each eye can be divided in two vertically, with the outer half being described as temporal, and the inner half being described as nasal.

"Bitemporal hemianopsia" can be broken down as follows:
 bi-: involves both left and right visual fields
 temporal: involves the temporal visual field
 hemi-: involves half of each visual field
 anopsia: blindness (formed by a(n) no + opsis vision + ia)

See also
 Binasal hemianopsia
 Homonymous hemianopsia
 Monocular temporal hemianopia

References

External links 

Blindness
Visual disturbances and blindness